Werik Silva Pinto (born 17 October 2001), known as Werik Popó, is a Brazilian footballer who plays as a forward for Red Bull Bragantino.

Club career

Oeste
Nicknamed after boxer Acelino Freitas by his mother's neighbor, Werik Popó was rejected by a number of clubs before joining Oeste's youth setup in 2020. In 2021, he moved on loan to Águia de Marabá on loan for the 2021 Campeonato Paraense, and made his senior debut with the club.

Back to Oeste, Werik Popó made his first team debut for the club on 19 June 2021, replacing Léo Artur late into a 0–0 Série C home draw against Criciúma. He alternated between the under-20 and first team squads, and was the top scorer of the 2022 Copa São Paulo de Futebol Júnior with eight goals in just six matches. 

Definitely promoted to the main squad, Werik Popó scored his first senior goal on 19 February 2022, netting a last-minute winner in a 2–1 Campeonato Paulista Série A2 away win over XV de Piracicaba. On 2 March, he scored a brace in a 3–1 win at Red Bull Brasil.

Red Bull Bragantino
On 12 August 2022, Werik Popó signed a five-year contract with Série A side Red Bull Bragantino. He made his debut in the category on 18 September, replacing injured Alerrandro in a 1–1 home draw against Goiás, but being himself substituted after 37 minutes on the field.

Career statistics

References

2001 births
Living people
Footballers from São Paulo
Brazilian footballers
Association football forwards
Campeonato Brasileiro Série A players
Campeonato Brasileiro Série C players
Campeonato Brasileiro Série D players
Oeste Futebol Clube players
Águia de Marabá Futebol Clube players
Red Bull Bragantino players